Mohamed Hassan (born 1940) is a Moroccan boxer. He competed in the men's featherweight event at the 1960 Summer Olympics.

1960 Olympic results
Below is the record of Mohamed Hassan, a Moroccan featherweight boxer who competed at the 1960 Rome Olympics:

 Round of 32: lost to Werner Kirsch (United Team of Germany) by decision, 1-4

References

External links
 

1940 births
Living people
Moroccan male boxers
Olympic boxers of Morocco
Boxers at the 1960 Summer Olympics
Sportspeople from Casablanca
Featherweight boxers
20th-century Moroccan people